Modern Ruin is the second studio album by English punk rock band Frank Carter & the Rattlesnakes. It was released in January 2017 through International Death Cult. To celebrate the album's release, a pop-up shop was opened at Sang Bleu tattoo in London.

Track listing

Personnel 
Frank Carter & the Rattlesnakes
 Frank Carter – vocals, guitar (track 1), production, art direction 
 Dean Richardson – guitar, production, art direction
 Thomas Mitchener – bass, production, engineering
 Gareth Grover – drums
Additional personnel
 Catherine Marks – mixing
 John Davies – mastering

Charts

References 

2017 albums
Frank Carter & The Rattlesnakes albums